Callianthe is a genus of flowering plants in the tribe Malveae. It is distributed throughout the Neotropics.

Species 
 Callianthe amoena
 Callianthe andrade-limae
 Callianthe bedfordiana
 Callianthe bezerrae
 Callianthe brenesii
 Callianthe cyclonervosa
 Callianthe darwinii
 Callianthe elegans
 Callianthe fluviatilis
 Callianthe geminiflora
 Callianthe glaziovii
 Callianthe inaequalis
 Callianthe jaliscana
 Callianthe jujuiensis
 Callianthe lanata
 Callianthe latipetala
 Callianthe laxa
 Callianthe longifolia
 Callianthe macrantha
 Callianthe malmeana
 Callianthe megapotamica
 Callianthe mexiae
 Callianthe montana
 Callianthe monteiroi
 Callianthe mouraei
 Callianthe muelleri-friderici
 Callianthe pachecoana
 Callianthe petiolaris
 Callianthe pickelii
 Callianthe picta
 Callianthe purpusii
 Callianthe regnellii
 Callianthe rufinerva
 Callianthe rufivela
 Callianthe scabrida
 Callianthe schenckii
 Callianthe sellowiana
 Callianthe senilis
 Callianthe striata
 Callianthe torrendii
 Callianthe tridens
 Callianthe vexillaria

References

External links 
 
 

 
Malvaceae genera